The 1946 Tasmanian state election was held on 23 November 1946 in the Australian state of Tasmania to elect 30 members of the Tasmanian House of Assembly. The election used the Hare-Clark proportional representation system — six members were elected from each of five electorates.

Incumbent Premier Robert Cosgrove continued to lead the Labor Party into the 1946 election. The Nationalist Party had reformed into the modern Liberal Party, and was led by Neil Campbell. This was Tasmania's first election since the end of World War II.

Labor won a majority in the election, although the party's vote was significantly reduced. Cosgrove dominated the government throughout Tasmania's post-war recovery.

Results

|}

  Several Nationalists did not join the new Liberal Party and ran as independents. Rex Townley was elected in Denison.

Distribution of votes

Primary vote by division

Distribution of seats

See also
 Members of the Tasmanian House of Assembly, 1946–1948
 Candidates of the 1946 Tasmanian state election

References

External links
Assembly Election Results, 1946, Parliament of Tasmania.
Report on Parliamentary Elections, 1947, Tasmanian Electoral Commission.

Elections in Tasmania
1946 elections in Australia
1940s in Tasmania
November 1946 events in Australia